Bondan Gunawan (24 April 1948 in Yogyakarta - 23 May 2019 in Jakarta) was an Indonesian politician who served as Minister of State Secretariat in 2000.

References

1948 births
2019 deaths
Government ministers of Indonesia
Gadjah Mada University alumni
People from Yogyakarta